HD 45364 is a star in the southern constellation of Canis Major. It is too faint to be visible to the naked eye, having an apparent visual magnitude of 8.08. The distance to this system is 112 light years based on parallax. It is drifting further away from the Sun with a radial velocity of +16.4 km/s, having come within  some 1.5 million years ago.

This object is an ordinary G-type main-sequence star with a stellar classification of G8V, which indicates it is generating energy through core hydrogen fusion. It is around 3.4 billion years old and is spinning with a projected rotational velocity of 1.7 km/s. The star has 88% of the mass of the Sun and 82% of the Sun's radius. It is radiating 56% of the luminosity of the Sun from its photosphere at an effective temperature of 5,540 K. As of August 2008 there are two confirmed extrasolar planets (or exoplanets) orbiting around it.

Planetary system 
HD 45364 is one of only a relative few systems that have had more than one exoplanet discovered in its orbit. The two planets, HD 45364 b and HD 45364 c respectively, were both discovered in August 2008 using the radial velocity method. The pair was initially believed to be orbiting the host star with a 3:2 mean motion resonance, which means the inner planet is completing three orbits for every two orbits of the outer planet. 

It was difficult to explain how such resonant configuration of planetary orbits could evolve, mainly due to too high (4-5 times) orbital eccentrities, although planetary system formation models involving hydrodynamic effects were proposed.

As in 2022, refined radial-velocity data shows the planetary orbits are more circular and widely spaced, therefore planets are slightly out of mean motion resonance state.

References 

G-type main-sequence stars
Planetary systems with two confirmed planets
Canis Major
Durchmusterung objects
045364
030579